William Edward "Eddie" Teare, (born 10 May 1948) is a Manx politician, who was the Minister of the Treasury from 2011 to 2016 after holding other ministerial positions. He was MHK (Member of the House of Keys) for Ayre from 2004 to 2016, having first been elected to the House in a 2004 by-election. He was educated at Ramsey Grammar School.

He is an associate of the Chartered Institute of Bankers and has a distinction in the Finance of Foreign Trade. He worked for the Isle of Man Bank from 1965 to 2004, rising to risk manager and senior relationship manager. He has also worked as a conveyancing manager at Laurence Keenan Advocates.

Personal life
Teare is married to Irene (née Craig). They have two children, Steven (born 1983) and Faye (born 1985).

Governmental positions
Chairman of the Manx Electricity Authority, 2005–07
Minister of Health and Social Security, 2006–10
Minister for Education and Children, 2010–11
Minister of the Treasury, 2011–16

References

1948 births
Living people
Manx politicians
Members of the House of Keys 2001–2006
Members of the House of Keys 2006–2011
Members of the House of Keys 2011–2016